Dečja Vas pri Zagradcu is a village on the right bank of the Krka River opposite Zagradec in the Municipality of Ivančna Gorica in central Slovenia. The area is part of the historical region of Lower Carniola. The municipality is now included in the Central Slovenia Statistical Region.

Name
The name of the settlement was changed from Dečja vas to Dečja vas pri Zagradcu in 1953.

References

External links

Dečja Vas pri Zagradcu on Geopedia

Populated places in the Municipality of Ivančna Gorica